Elizabeth Coker may refer to:

 Libby Coker, Australian politician
 Dame Elizabeth Coker, British businessperson, see List of Dames Commander of the Order of the British Empire